The Act for the abolishing and putting away of diverse books and images 1549 (3 & 4 Edw. 6 c. 10) was an Act of the Parliament of England. 

The preamble of the Act recites: 

It then proceeds to order the abolishing of all other religious books, as they tend to superstition and idolatry; and commands all persons to deface and destroy images of all kinds that were erected for religious worship, under a penalty for any to prevent the same. 

The act concludes, however, with a clause emphasising that its provisions do not extend to the effigies on tomb monuments: 

It also stipulates that the people might still keep the primers set forth by the late king Henry VIII provided they erase the sentences of invocation, and names of popish saints.

The act was repealed by Mary I, but James I re-established it.

See also 
 Iconoclasm
 Timeline of the English Reformation

References

Acts of the Parliament of England (1485–1603)
1549 in law
1549 in England
Christianity and law in the 16th century
Acts of the Parliament of England concerning religion
Aniconism
1549 in Christianity